A pawn shop is a shop that takes possessions as pledge.

Pawn Shop may also refer to:

 Pawn Shop (album), a 2016 album by Brothers Osborne
 Pawn Shop, a 2012 film with Garrett Morris
 Pawn Shop, a line of guitars; see List of products manufactured by Fender Musical Instruments Corporation
 "Pawn Shop", a song by Sublime from Sublime
 "Pawn Shop", a song by Sonny Terry & Brownie McGhee from Down Home Blues
 "Pawn Shop", the original title of the song "Mammoth" by Interpol
The Pawnshop, a 1916 Charlie Chaplin film
 Pawnshop (film), a 2013 film directed by Liubomyr Levytskyi

See also